Jean-Robert is a French masculine given name. Notable people with the name include:

 Jean-Robert Argand (1768–1822), French gifted amateur mathematician
 Jean-Robert Bellande (born 1970), American nightclub owner, promoter and poker player
 Jean-Robert Gauthier (1929–2009), Canadian politician
 Jean-Robert Ipoustéguy (1920–2006), French sculptor

French masculine given names
Compound given names